The Life of Paddy Reilly, Irish folk singer Paddy Reilly's debut album, was released in 1971 on the Dolphin label. The album introduced some of the singer's most popular songs, including "James Larkin", "Matt Hyland", and "Spancil Hill". It was produced by Reilly and Darby Carroll. The title of the album is a play on the name of a popular radio and television show, The Life of Riley.

Track listing
All traditional except as noted.

Side one
"Spancil Hill"
"Coming of the Road" (Billy Edd Wheeler)
"Sam Hall"
"Come to the Bower"
"Deportees" (Woody Guthrie, Martin Hoffman)
"Dollymount Strand"

Side two
"Irish Soldier Boy"
"Matt Hyland"
"The Orange and the Green" (Anthony Murphy; traditional)
"James Larkin"
"James Connolly" (Liam McGowan)
"The Lark in the Morning"

Paddy Reilly albums
1973 albums